MAP kinase-activated protein kinase 2 is an enzyme that in humans is encoded by the MAPKAPK2 gene.

Function 

This gene encodes a member of the Ser/Thr protein kinase family. This kinase is regulated through direct phosphorylation by p38 MAP kinase. In conjunction with p38 MAP kinase, this kinase is known to be involved in many cellular processes including stress and inflammatory responses, nuclear export, gene expression regulation and cell proliferation. Heat shock protein HSP27 was shown  to be its major  direct  substrate in vivo. Two transcript variants encoding two different isoforms have been found for this gene.

Vascular barrier 
MK2 pathway has been demonstrated to have a key role in maintaining and repairing the integrity of endothelial barrier in the lung via actin and vimentin remodeling. Activation of MK2 via its phosphorylation by p38 has been shown to restore the vascular barrier and repair vascular leak, associated with over 60 medical conditions, including Acute Respiratory Distress Syndrome (ARDS), a major cause of death around the world.

SASP initiation 
MAPKAPK2 mediates the initiation of the senescence-associated secretory phenotype (SASP) by mTOR (mechanistic target of rapamycin).  Interleukin 1 alpha (IL1A) is found on the surface of senescent cells, where it contributes to the production of SASP factors due to a positive feedback loop with NF-κB. Translation of mRNA for IL1A is highly dependent upon mTOR activity. mTOR activity increases levels of IL1A, mediated by MAPKAPK2.

See also 
 SB 203580, suppresses the activation of MAPKAPK2
MK2-AP directly activates MAPKAPK2 independent of p38.

Interactions 

MAPKAPK2 has been shown to interact with:
 AKT1, 
 MAPK14, 
 PHC2,  and
 SHC1.
 RIPK1

References

Further reading 

 
 
 
 
 
 
 
 
 
 
 
 
 
 
 
 
 
 

EC 2.7.11